Eric Jackson may refer to:

Eric Jackson (journalist) (born 1952), Panamanian politician, journalist, and radio talk show host
Eric Jackson (kayaker) (born 1964), freestyle kayaker, kayak designer, and founder of Jackson Kayak
Eric M. Jackson, president of World Ahead Publishing and former PayPal VP of marketing
Eric Jackson, American professional wrestler
Eric Jackson (mayor) (born 1959), mayor of Trenton, New Jersey